João Batista Oliveira de Araujo, also known as Babá, is a Brazilian politician. He is a former member of the Workers' Party (PT), and a founding member of the Socialism and Liberty Party (PSOL), in which he is affiliated to Socialist Workers' Current tendency.

References 

Living people
Workers' Party (Brazil) politicians
Socialism and Liberty Party politicians
Brazilian Trotskyists
Year of birth missing (living people)